The Fubon Guardians are a professional baseball team in the Chinese Professional Baseball League (CPBL) in Taiwan. The team is owned by Fubon Financial Holding Co. and play their home games at Xinzhuang Baseball Stadium in New Taipei City.

History

The Jungo Era (1993–1995)
The Jungo Bears existed in the Chinese Professional Baseball League (CPBL) between 1993 and 1995. Originally formed as an amateur club by the Taichung-based Jungo Corporation in 1989, this club was professionalized in 1992 after absorbing a group of players from the Chinese Taipei national baseball team who just won the silver medal in the 1992 Summer Olympics, similar to its sister team China Times Eagles. This club took Taichung Baseball Field as its home throughout its history.

Despite a nice start, this club had been performing poorly throughout its short history, mainly due to the controversial leading styles of Jungo Corporation's then chairman Chen I-ping (陳一平). After a chain of rows over TV broadcast rights and the distribution of TV broadcast royalties, in November 1995 the other 5 teams of CPBL expelled Chen I-ping and Jungo Corporation's all legal rights inside CPBL. The Sinon Corporation took over this team and renamed it as Sinon Bears, which was later renamed again as Sinon Bulls in June 1996. Later in 1999 Chen I-ping and Jungo Corporation sought to sponsor Taiwan Major League (TML)'s Taichung Agan but TML did not respond.

Sinon Bulls (1996–2012)
The Sinon Bulls were founded in 1996 and are owned by the Taichung-based Sinon Corporation, which is known for its agricultural product lines, insurance, and supermarket chains through Central Taiwan.  After a poor first season, the Bulls managed a winning record for the first time in second half of the 1997 season, and achieved the feat for a full season for the first time in 1998. In this season, the Bulls made it to the championship series for the first time, losing to the Wei Chuan Dragons four games to three. Sinon would advance to the finals in 2000 and 2003 as well, losing both times.

It was in 2004 that the Bulls finally made their breakthrough with a come-from-behind seven game series win. They made it back-to-back Taiwan Series wins with a sweep of the Macoto Cobras the following year, their third consecutive trip to the championship series. The Bulls made the playoffs four years in a row (2003–2006), a CPBL record they shared with the Wei Chuan Dragons, who also appeared in four consecutive playoff rounds from 1996–1999.

The Bulls also participated in the first annual Konami Cup Asia Series in Japan following its Taiwan Series victory in 2005. While defeating a team of all-stars from the Chinese league, they lost to the champions of Japan and South Korea en route to a 1–2 showing.

At the end of the 2012 season, Sinon Corporation announced its intention to sell the team. By late December, an agreement was reached between Sinon Corporation and E-United Group, and the team was renamed EDA Rhinos after E-DA World, a large shopping, entertainment and hotel complex in Kaohsiung operated by E-United Group.

EDA Rhinos (2013–2016)

The EDA Rhinos intends to play games at both Li De Baseball Stadium in downtown Kaohsiung and Chengcing Lake Baseball Field in the suburb during the upcoming 2013 CPBL season.  The Rhinos also signaled in signing Manny Ramirez for 2013 as its billboard player. Taiwanese former MLB player Chin-lung Hu also signed with the team following 2013 CPBL Draft.

In June 2016 it was announced that the E-United Group are willing to sell the team. The team won the second stage of the 2016 CPBL season and qualified to the Taiwan Series, where they defeated Chinatrust Brothers 4–2 to win their first championship since 2005.

Fubon Guardians (2017–present)
In November 2016, the team was renamed as Fubon Guardians after Fubon Financial Holding Co. bought the team.

Records

Regular seasons

Playoffs

Asia Series

Roster

List of managers

Fubon Guardians (2017–present)

References

External links

Official website 
Official Twitter profile

Chinese Professional Baseball League teams
Baseball teams established in 1993
1993 establishments in Taiwan
Sport in New Taipei